Antone Rego (October 31, 1897 – January 6, 1978), was a Major League Baseball catcher who played in  and  with the St. Louis Browns. He was born as Antone DoRego.

Rego was one of the only players to come from Hawaii for nearly 80 years. He was of Portuguese heritage and could play the ukulele. 

He played for 44 games with the Browns in 1924 and 1925, mostly as a backup player.

References

External links

Major League Baseball catchers
St. Louis Browns players
Big Spring Barons players
Baseball players from Hawaii
People from Maui County, Hawaii
1897 births
1978 deaths